This is a list of Christian missions in Africa. 

 4africa
 Africa Inland Mission
 Algiers Mission Band
 Anglican Frontier Missions
 Apostolic Faith Mission of South Africa
 Basel Mission
 Church Mission Society
 Cowley Fathers
International Missionaries for Christ
 London Missionary Society
 Mission Africa
 Mission Aviation Fellowship
 Missionary Bishop
 Rhenish Missionary Society
 Society for the Propagation of the Gospel in Foreign Parts
 Sudan Interior Mission
 Heart of Africa Mission
 Zambezi Industrial Mission

See also
 Christianity in Africa
 List of Christian missionaries
 List of converts to Christianity
 List of Roman Catholic missions in Africa
 Mission (Christian)
 Timeline of Christian missions

C
M
Christian missions in Africa
Protestantism in Africa